Doc Hines may refer to:
Andy Hines (born 1962), American futurist
Donald E. Hines (1933–2019), American family physician and politician who served on the Louisiana Senate
Jacob Hines (1927–2020), American veterinarian and politician who served on the Wisconsin State Assembly